Shah Sultan Hussein mosque is a historical mosque of the XVIII century, located in the village of Novkhany in Absheron district of Azerbaijan, 21 kilometers from Baku. It is estimated that the mosque was once located in the center of an ancient residential center, which currently is a desert.

About the mosque
The mosque belongs to architectural school of Absheron.

Although the size of the mosque is small, size and tone keeps architectural elements in the walls. Motifs and architectural elements of the walls of the mosque, which are not large, are still preserved. The walls of the prayer room are decorated with ornaments. The dome is one of the basic constructions in the prayer room. The main function of it is to keep atmosphere of the hall constant, illuminate the hall, and create a reverberation in the hall. The exterior of the mosque and its architectural solution form unity. Prayer room is merged with service room.

In the framework of anti-religious policies, the mosque was closed to visitors by Soviet authorities in the 1930s. As a result, the mosque was destroyed and became useless.

Gallery

References

Monuments and memorials in Azerbaijan
Mosques in Azerbaijan